This is a list of the National Register of Historic Places listings in Mifflin County, Pennsylvania.

This is intended to be a complete list of the properties on the National Register of Historic Places in Mifflin County, Pennsylvania, United States. The locations of National Register properties and districts for which the latitude and longitude coordinates are included below, may be seen in a map.

There are 9 properties listed on the National Register in the county.

Current listings

|}

See also

 List of National Historic Landmarks in Pennsylvania
 National Register of Historic Places listings in Pennsylvania
 List of Pennsylvania state historical markers in Mifflin County

References

 
Mifflin County